SC Herisau is a Swiss ice hockey team.

Founded: 1942
Home arena: Sportzentrum Herisau (capacity 3,152)
Swiss Championships won: 0
Nationalliga B Championships won: 1 (1997)

References

Ice hockey teams in Switzerland
Herisau